Minnie Augusta Jahnke (October 11, 1872 – March 14, 1954) was an American jeweler, based in Richmond, Virginia.

Early life 
Minnie Augusta Jahnke was born at "Shady Echo", her family's farm in Bon Air, Virginia, one of the ten children of Albert Franz Jahnke and Mary Beaufort Chalkley Jahnke. Her father was a jeweler, trained in Germany before he arrived in the United States. Several of her brothers were also jewelers.

Career 
When her brother died in the 1930s, Minnie Jahnke took over the family's jewelry shop in Richmond, where she had already worked for many years. She was known for buying, selling, and appraising antique gold, silver, clocks, gemstones, and other heirlooms, for prominent Southern families. She closed the business in 1952.

Minnie Jahnke was an active member of the Second Presbyterian Church in Richmond, and a charter member of Richmond's Quota Club and the Business and Professional Women's Club, involved in clubwork at the local and national levels.

Personal life 
Jahnke died in 1954, aged 81 years, at a hospital in Richmond. A road near Richmond is named for the Jahnke family of jewelers. The Jahnke family papers are held at the Valentine Museum in Richmond.

References

External links 

 Laura Smith, "Albert F. Jahnke Pocket Watch Survives in Richmond VA" Sunday Historical (January 24, 2015); a blog post about a pocket watch made by the Jahnkes, with photographs

1872 births
1954 deaths
People from Richmond, Virginia
American jewellers
American women in business
Women jewellers